Michirō, Michiro or Michirou (written: 道朗 or ミチロウ in katakana) is a masculine Japanese given name. Notable people with the name include:

, Japanese musician, writer and activist
, Japanese composer, singer and musician

Japanese masculine given names